John Joseph Day is a former Democratic member of the Indiana House of Representatives, representing the 100th District from 1996 until 2012. He previously served from 1974 through 1994.

External links
Indiana State Legislature – Representative John Day Official government website
Project Vote Smart – Representative John J. Day (IN) profile
Follow the Money – John Day
2006 2004 2002 2000 1998 1996 1994 campaign contributions

Democratic Party members of the Indiana House of Representatives
1937 births
Living people
Politicians from Indianapolis